The 2018 ICF World Junior and U23 Canoe Slalom Championships took place in Ivrea, Italy from 17 to 22 July 2018 under the auspices of the International Canoe Federation (ICF). It was the 20th edition of the competition for Juniors (U18) and the 7th edition for the Under 23 category.

A total of 22 medal events took place, 11 in each of the two age categories. It was the first time that there were no men's C2 events at these championships. The mixed C2 event for juniors as well as the four Extreme K1 events were included in the program for the first time.

Medal summary

Men

Canoe

Junior

U23

Kayak

Junior

U23

Women

Canoe

Junior

U23

Kayak

Junior

U23

Mixed

Canoe

Junior

U23

Medal table

References

External links
International Canoe Federation

ICF World Junior and U23 Canoe Slalom Championships
ICF World Junior and U23 Canoe Slalom Championships
World Junior and U23 Canoe Slalom Championships